Mindelo is a port city in the northern part of the island of São Vicente in Cape Verde. Mindelo is also the seat of the parish of Nossa Senhora da Luz, and the municipality of São Vicente. The city is home to 93% of the entire island's population. Mindelo is known for its colourful and animated carnival celebrations, with roots in Portuguese traditions later influenced by the Brazilian culture.

History

A settlement at Mindelo was founded in 1793 by the Portuguese. It was initially named Nossa Senhora da Luz, renamed Leopoldina around 1820 after the Queen consort. In 1838 it was renamed Mindelo after the 1832 Landing at Mindelo, north of Porto. It became a coal deposit for ships of the British East India Company in 1838, followed by the Royal Mail Steam Packet Company in 1850. The settlement became a town (vila) in 1858, and had 1,400 inhabitants then. It became a city (cidade) in 1879, and had 3,717 inhabitants then. In 1884 a submarine communications cable was laid between Europe, Africa, India and North America, making Mindelo an important communications centre for the British Empire.

From the beginning of the 20th century the port of Mindelo lost its importance for transatlantic navigation. Causes for this were the shift from coal to oil as fuel for ships, the rise of competing ports like Dakar and the Canary Islands and the lack of investment in port infrastructure. Between 1910 and 1940 there were several strikes in Mindelo, and on 7 June 1934 there were riots in the streets of Mindelo, caused by unemployment and poverty. One man was killed; several were injured.

Between 1940 and 1958 three prolonged periods of severe drought, combined with soil erosion and overgrazing, brought famine in Cape Verde. In the whole archipelago, about 45,000 people died and 20,000 people emigrated. Mindelo attracted immigrants, notably from nearby Santo Antão, and continued to grow.

Mindelo was the cultural capital of the Portuguese-speaking world from November 2002 until November 2003. Mindelo is also considered the cultural capital of Cape Verde.

Geography

Mindelo is situated at the Porto Grande Bay, a large natural harbour. The town is surrounded by low mountains: the Monte Cara and the Morro Branco headland to the west, and the Monte Verde to the east. The town is crossed by the river Ribeira de Julião.

Ferries for Santo Antão leave from the port.

Subdivisions
The city is divided into the following localities for statistical reasons:

Alto Miramar
Alto Morabeza
Alto Santo António
Alto São Nicolau
Alto Solarine/Forca
Atrás do Cemitério/Sul do Cemitério
Bela Vista/Pedreira
Campinho
Chã de Alecrim
Chã de Cemitério
Chã de Marinha
Chã de Monte Sossego
Chê Guevarra
City center/Morada
Cruz João Evora
Dji d'Sal
Fernando Pó
Fonte Cónego
Fonte Filipe
Fonte Françês
Fonte Inês/Espia
Fonte Meio/Madeiralzinho
Fortinho/Escola Técnica
Horta Seca
Lazareto
Matiota
Monte/Craca
Monte Sossego
Pedra Rolada
Ribeira Bote
Ribeira da Craquinha
Ribeira de Julião
Ribeira de Passarão
Ribeirinha
Tchetchênia
Vila Nova/Lombo Tanque
Zona Industrial Sul
Zona Militar

Climate
Mindelo city has a desert climate (Köppen: BWh). It is very dry with only around  annual precipitation.

Economy

Its economy consists mainly of business, fishing, shipping, boating and more commonly tourism which developed more recently. Mindelo has several hotels, restaurants and tourist agencies.

Cityscape

The main streets of Mindelo are Avenida Marginal along the waterfront, and the perpendicular Rua Libertadores de África (former Rua Lisboa). Many colonial buildings from the 19th and early 20th century have been preserved in the city centre. Sites of interest include:
Paços do Concelho, built 1860–1873, the city hall of the municipality of São Vicente
Palácio do Povo (People's Palace), the former Palácio do Governo (Government Palace), built in 1874, expanded in 1928-34
Our Lady of the Light Cathedral, Catholic church built in 1862, seat of the Roman Catholic Diocese of Mindelo
Centro Nacional de Artesanato e Design, built as the house of Senator Vera Cruz at the end of the 19th century, now houses exhibitions from Cape Verdean craftsmen
Fortim d'El Rei, a former fortress built in 1852
Torre de Belém, on the waterfront, a 1918-1937 replica of the Belém Tower in Lisbon
Farol do Ilhéu dos Pássaros, lighthouse on Ilhéu dos Pássaros
Municipal market, built in 1878
the former Customs House, now the Cultural Centre of Mindelo, built 1858-1860
Former British Consulate, built in the 1870s

Statues
Statue of Diogo Afonso on Mindelo Beach - after the explorer of the island
Statue of Baltasar Lopes da Silva - after one of the most famous writers of Cape Verde

International relations
Mindelo has been twinned with the following cities:

Twin towns – sister cities

 Porto, Norte, Portugal
 Coimbra, Centro, Portugal
 Kronach, Bavaria, Germany
 New Bedford, United States
 St Helena Bay, Western Cape, South Africa

Education
University of Cape Verde, Faculty of Engineering and Maritime Sciences and School of Business and Governance 
Jean Piaget University of Cape Verde - Mindelo campus
University of Mindelo - Cape Verde's third university
Escola Jorge Barbosa (Liceu Velho) - a campus of the University of Cape Verde
Liceu Ludgero Lima - A high school

Demography
At the 2010 census, Mindelo had 70,468 inhabitants. It is the second largest city in Cape Verde after Praia.

Sporting teams
Mindelo has several sports teams that includes the city, Académica, Corinthians and Derby are clubs that includes the entire island.
Académica do Mindelo – football, basketball, athletics
Batuque FC - football
GS Castilho – football, cricket
FC Derby – football
CS Mindelense – football, the oldest club in Cape Verde

The main football stadium is Estádio Municipal Adérito Sena. Basketball, volleyball and futsal are played at Polivalente de Amarante in the southwest.

Notable people

Bana – singer
Bau – guitar and cavaquinho player
Yorgan de Castro - mixed martial artist who competes in the Heavyweight division of the UFC
B. Leza (1905-1958) – writer, composer and singer
Josimar Dias (born 1986) – footballer, also called Vozinha
Bela Duarte – artist
Cesária Évora (1941-2011) – folk singer
Fantcha – singer
Humberto Duarte Fonseca (1916-1983) – scientist
Corsino Fortes (1933-2015) – writer
Fock – footballer
Sergio Frusoni (1901-1975) – poet
António Aurélio Gonçalves (1901-1984)– writer, critic, historian and professor
Leão Lopes – community developer, documentary-maker, politician
Manuel Lopes (1907–2005) – writer, one of the founders of Claridade
João Cleofas Martins (born 1901) - photographer and humorist
Ovídio Martins (born 1928) - poet
Vasco Martins – musician
Tito Paris (born 1968) –  musician
Gualberto do Rosário (born 1950) – acting Prime Minister and later Prime Minister of Cape Verde
Onésimo Silveira (1935–2021) – poet, diplomat and a political activist
Jenifer Solidade (born 1984) - singer 
Carlos Veiga (born 1949) – former Prime Minister of Cape Verde

See also

History of Cape Verde
Economy of Cape Verde

References

 
Cities in Cape Verde